OK Golf is a golfing video game. It was released by Okidokico Entertainment Inc on IOS on February 9, 2017. It was released on Android by Playdigious  on May 9, 2017.

Gameplay 
The player plays the game by dragging the ball back to make a shot. If the player drags back for longer the player's shot more powerful. The game is level based with various courses, each with nine holes each.

Reception 
OK Golf received mixed reviews. Gamezebo gave the game a rating of 3 out of 5 stars praising the game's "strong 3D graphics that allow you a clear picture of the hole and its topography" and that it "plays enough like mini-golf to appeal to a general audience" while criticizing the game's "lack of ability to choose your own club will likely infuriate golf fans", the "manipulation of the gameplay surface can be quite sticky (really needs autorotate capabilities)" and  "the pars are less than realistic (misses the mark on following the rules of golf)". Touch Arcade gave the game 3.5 out of 5 stars saying "it does exactly what it says on the tin cup".

References 

2017 video games
Android (operating system) games
IOS games
Golf video games
Video games developed in Canada
Playdigious games